Chapar Khaneh (also Romanized as Chāpār Khāneh; also known as Chefar-Khane and Jāpar Khāneh) is a village in Chapar Khaneh Rural District, Khomam District, Rasht County, Gilan Province, Iran. At the 2006 census, its population was 1,112, in 301 families.

References 

Populated places in Rasht County